General Bruce may refer to:

Alexander Romanovich Bruce (1704–1760), Imperial Russian Army lieutenant general
Andrew Davis Bruce (1894–1969), U.S. Army lieutenant general
Bob Bruce (British Army officer) (fl. 1980s–2020s), British Army major general
Charles Granville Bruce (1866–1939), British Indian Army brigadier general
Geoffrey Bruce (Indian Army officer) (1896–1972), British Indian Army major general
Jacob Bruce (1669–1735), Russian Army major general of artillery
James Bruce (1732–1791) (1732–1791), Imperial Russian Army general
Robert Bruce (British Army officer, born 1813), British Army major general
Robert Bruce (British Army officer, born 1821), British Army general
Robert Bruce (1668–1720), Imperial Russian Army lieutenant general
Thomas Bruce (British Army officer) (1738–1797), British Army lieutenant general